James "Jay" Taylor (born October 23, 1976) is a former American professional football kicker. He played collegiately for the West Virginia Mountaineers.

High school years
Taylor attended Hershey High School in Hershey, Pennsylvania and starred in football, soccer, and tennis. In football, he was an All-Conference selection.

College career
Taylor attended West Virginia University and was a student and a four-year letterman in football. Taylor played both kicker and punter in his four-year career from 1996 to 1999.

In his sophomore season in 1997, Taylor kicked a career-long 52-yard field goal against Pittsburgh in the Backyard Brawl.

Against Ohio State, as a junior in 1998, Taylor punted for a career-high 410 yards. Against Virginia Tech that same season, Taylor had a career-long 63-yard punt.

Professional career

Miami Dolphins
Jay Taylor was signed as an undrafted free agent by the Miami Dolphins in 2000. Taylor was cut shortly afterwards.

Orlando Rage
He was selected by the Orlando Rage of the XFL in the 2001 XFL Draft, where he played both kicker and punter.

Buffalo Bills
After the XFL season ended, the Buffalo Bills signed him to the preseason roster, primarily as a punter. He lost the competition to Brian Moorman and was waived during the preseason.

Rhein Fire
In 2003, he played for the Rhein Fire of NFL Europe, allocated from the Cleveland Browns.

Tampa Bay Buccaneers
He was a member of the Tampa Bay Buccaneers practice squad in 2004 and was activated by the Bucs that year, playing in 5 games.

Orlando Predators
After being cut by the Tampa Bay Buccaneers in 2005, Taylor was signed by the Orlando Predators of the Arena Football League on June 30, 2006.

Taylor entered the 2008 season as the franchise leader in single-season field goal percentage, career field goal percentage, single-season extra point percentage, career extra point percentage, consecutive extra points made, and consecutive field goals made. He also won the 2004 Kicker of the Year award with the Predators.

References

External links
 Orlando Predators profile
 Profile at ArenaFan
 Stats at DatabaseFootball.com
 http://browns.scout.com/a.z?s=149&p=8&c=1&nid=610803 Brown's profile at Scout.com

1976 births
Living people
People from Hershey, Pennsylvania
American football placekickers
American football punters
West Virginia Mountaineers football players
Orlando Rage players
Rhein Fire players
Tampa Bay Buccaneers players
Orlando Predators players